S. Peter Cowe is Narekatsi Professor of Armenian Studies at UCLA and has taught at the Hebrew University of Jerusalem, University of Chicago, and Columbia University. He is also a writer, researcher.

His research interests include medieval Armenian history, modern Armenian nationalism, and Armenian film and theater. The author of five books in the field and the editor of four others, he is currently preparing a study on the earliest extant Armenian play from the seventeenth century. A regular contributor to Armenological journals, he is the editor of the Journal of the Society for Armenian Studies and has received a grant from the National Council on Eurasian and East European Research to investigate the post-Soviet publishing industry in Armenia. He is fluent in French, German, Greek and Armenian.

Books
Commentary on the Divine Liturgy by Xosrov Anjewatsi (1991) 
The Armenian Version of Daniel (1992)
Mxitar Sasnetsi's Theological Discourses (1993)  	 
The Armenian Manuscripts (1994)
The Deaconess in the Armenian Church (1994), translator	 
 (includes an essay by Cowe)
Modern Armenian Drama: An Anthology, co-editor & part. (2001)

References

Armenian studies scholars
Armenian educators
Living people
Year of birth missing (living people)
Place of birth missing (living people)
University of Chicago faculty
Columbia University faculty
Academic staff of the Hebrew University of Jerusalem
University of California, Los Angeles faculty
University of California Near Eastern Languages and Cultures faculty